The 2017 Canoe Sprint European Championships is the 29th edition of the Canoe Sprint European Championships, an international sprint canoe/kayak and paracanoe event organised by the European Canoe Association, held in Plovdiv, Bulgaria, between 14 and 16 July 2017.

Canoe sprint

Medal table

Men

Women

Medal reallocation

Paracanoe

Medal table

Medal events
 Non-Paralympic classes

References

External links
Official website
Europe Canoe Events results site
Canoe sprint results
Paracanoe results

Canoe Sprint European Championships
Canoe Sprint European Championships
European Sprint Championships
International sports competitions hosted by Bulgaria
Litoměřice District
Canoeing and kayaking competitions in Bulgaria
July 2017 sports events in Europe